Carandaí is a Brazilian municipality located in the state of Minas Gerais. The population in 2020 was 25,669 people in a total area of 487 km2. The city belongs to the mesoregion of Campo das Vertentes and to the microregion of Barbacena.

Carandaí lies on the important BR-040 highway, 35 km. north of Barbacena.  The main economic activities are services, cattle raising, milk and cheese production, small transformation industries, and the growing of flowers, fruits, vegetables, corn, coffee, potatoes, and beans.  In 2005 there were 3 financial institutions.  In the health sector there were 12 clinics and one hospital with 51 beds (2005).  In the educational sector there were 23 primary schools and 3 middle schools.  There were 2 campuses of private institutions of higher learning with 168 students in 2005. 

Municipal Human Development Index
MHDI: .760
Ranking in the state: 209 out of 853 municipalities
Ranking in the country: 1,588 out of 5,138 municipalities
Life expectancy: 72 (2000)
Literacy rate: 90 (2000) See Frigoletto

See also
 List of municipalities in Minas Gerais

References

IBGE

Municipalities in Minas Gerais